Alan Gough (born 10 March 1971) is an English football player and manager. He is the former Longford Town player manager.

His clubs included Portsmouth, Galway United, Fulham, Shelbourne, Glentoran, Derry City and Bray Wanderers.

Playing career
Gough was born in Watford. He began his career initially as an apprentice with Portsmouth before moving to Ireland with Galway United. After eighteen months with Galway, he joined Shelbourne, with whom he spent five highly successful seasons. In the 1996 FAI Cup Final he was sent off at Lansdowne Road.

In July 1999, Gough made the switch to Glentoran and had an excellent first season, winning three winners medals in the process. He was in terrific form in the Irish Cup Final and played a large part in the victory. He finished his career as team-captain at Galway United at the end of the 2006 season but continued to play in 2007 as an emergency goalkeeper as well as his assistant manager role. On 31 March 2008, he was sacked from Galway United along with the rest of the management team.

He won numerous major honours both north and south of the Irish border. They include five under-21 international caps with the Republic of Ireland in the early 1990s, youth caps, FAI Cup medals and League Cup medals.

On 22 May 2008, he was signed by Bray Wanderers as a player.

Managerial career
On 22 December 2008, Gough was announced as new manager of Longford Town. While managing Longford Gough was forced to don the goalkeeping gloves for a spell due to the lack of a regular custodian

Gough resigned as manager of Longford Town on 24 May 2009 following a poor run of results.

Honours
Shelbourne
 FAI Cup: 1996, 1997
 League of Ireland Cup: 1995–96

Glentoran
 Irish Cup: 1999–2000, 2000–01
 Irish League Cup: 2000–01

Derry City
 FAI Cup: 2002

References

External links

1971 births
Living people
People from Watford
Republic of Ireland association footballers
Association football goalkeepers
League of Ireland players
League of Ireland managers
NIFL Premiership players
Portsmouth F.C. players
Fulham F.C. players
Galway United F.C. players
Galway United F.C. managers
Shelbourne F.C. players
Glentoran F.C. players
Derry City F.C. players
Bray Wanderers F.C. players
Longford Town F.C. players
Longford Town F.C. managers
Republic of Ireland under-21 international footballers
Republic of Ireland youth international footballers
English Football League players
Republic of Ireland football managers